Yurmaty Salavat is an ice hockey team in Salavat, Russia. They were founded in 2008, and play in the Pervaya Liga, the third level of Russian ice hockey.

External links
 Official site

Ice hockey teams in Russia
Ice hockey clubs established in 2008
2008 establishments in Russia